The 1929 college football season saw a number of unbeaten and untied teams. Purdue, Tulane, Notre Dame and Pittsburgh all finished the regular season with wins over all their opponents. Notre Dame was recognized as national champion by two of three contemporary major selectors (the Dickinson and Dunkel Systems), while the third (Houlgate) named USC (10–2). Eight of nine retrospective selectors later also named Notre Dame and USC as No. 1 teams. 

Following the season, Pittsburgh traveled to Pasadena to meet USC in the Rose Bowl, at that time the only postseason college football game, where  the Trojans defeated the Panthers, 47–14. Four years later, football historian Parke Davis selected Pittsburgh as "Outstanding Nationwide Team" for 1929, the only one of 12 major selectors to do so. Pittsburgh claims a 1929 national championship on this basis.

A major change in the rules for 1929 was that a fumbled ball was dead as soon as it struck the ground.  Previously, a defending player could run with a recovered fumble, as in the case of Roy Riegels in the 1929 Rose Bowl.

Conference and program changes

Conferences
Three new conferences began play in 1929:
Arkansas Intercollegiate Conference – an NAIA conference active through the 1995 season
Big Four Conference – active through the 1932 season; replaced the newly-defunct Oklahoma Intercollegiate Conference
Oklahoma Collegiate Athletic Conference –  an NAIA conference active through the 1973 season; replaced the newly-defunct Oklahoma Intercollegiate Conference

Programs
The Duke Blue Devils were independent in 1928 and joined the Southern Conference in 1929.

September
September 21 In Dallas, Southern Methodist University (SMU) opened its season with a 13–3 win over North Texas State.

September 28

SMU and Howard Payne College played to a 13–13 tie, and TCU rolled over visiting Daniel Baker College, 61–0.   
In Los Angeles, USC opened its season against crosstown rival UCLA, rolling over the Bruins 76–0.
Pittsburgh beat Waynesburg State, 53–0
California beat Santa Clara 27–6
Pennsylvania beat Franklin & Marshall 14–7  
Tulane opened with a win over Northwestern State, 40–6

October

October 5 

SMU and Nebraska played to a 0–0 tie in Nebraska.
Notre Dame opened its season with a 14–0 win at Indiana
TCU beat Hardin Simmons, 20–0
Illinois beat Kansas 25–0, and Purdue beat Kansas State, 26–14
Pittsburgh won at Duke, 52–7
USC beat Oregon State 21–7
Pennsylvania defeated Swarthmore 20–6
California and St. Mary's played to a 0–0 tie.
Tulane beat Texas A&M, 13–10

October 12

In Baltimore, Notre Dame defeated Navy, 14–7.
SMU beat Austin College, 16–0
In Shreveport, TCU registered another shutout, beating Centenary College 28–0
Nebraska won at Syracuse, 13–6
USC won at Washington, 48–0, and California beat visiting Washington State, 14–0.
Purdue beat Michigan 30–16 and Illinois beat Bradley 45–0
Pittsburgh beat West Virginia 27–7
Pennsylvania beat Virginia Tech, 14–8
Tulane beat Mississippi State, 34–0

October 19

Pittsburgh handed Nebraska its first loss, 12–7; 
TCU surrendered its first points, but beat Texas A&M, 13–7.  Illinois and Iowa played to a 7–7 tie.
Purdue beat DePauw 26–7
Tulane beat Lafayette College of Louisiana, 60–0
USC scored big again, with a 64–0 win over Occidental.  At 4–0–0, the Trojans had outscored their opponents 209–7.  In Chicago, Notre Dame defeated Wisconsin 19–0

In Philadelphia, (1–0–1) California and (3–0) Pennsylvania played, with California winning 12–7

October 26 During the weekend between October 24 and October 29, 1929 (see Wall Street Crash of 1929), SMU beat visiting Ole Miss, 52–0 and TCU, with a 131–7 aggregate lead over its opponents, won its fifth straight, a 22–0 win over Texas Tech.  In Pittsburgh, the Pitt Panthers beat Allegheny 40–0 and Notre Dame defeated Carnegie Tech 7–0.  Illinois beat visiting Michigan 14–0, and Purdue won at Chicago 26–0
The USC offense was held to single digits at Stanford, winning 7–0.  California defeated the non-college Olympic Club, 21–19.  Pennsylvania beat Lehigh 10–7 and in New Orleans, Tulane beat Georgia Tech, 20–14.  Nebraska and Missouri played to a 7–7 tie.

November

November 2  
In Los Angeles, USC (5–0–0) hosted California (4–0–1).  California handed the Trojans their first loss, 15–7
In Dallas, unbeaten (3–0–2) SMU and unbeaten and untied Texas (5–0–0) both stayed unbeaten, playing to 0–0 tie.
Notre Dame beat visiting Georgia Tech 26–6
In Columbus, Georgia, Tulane beat Georgia, 21–15

TCU beat North Texas State, 25–0 
Nebraska beat Kansas, 12–6
Purdue won at Wisconsin 13–0, but Illinois lost at Northwestern, 7–0, 
Pittsburgh beat Ohio State, 18–2
Pennsylvania defeated Navy, 7–2

November 9

SMU won at Texas A&M 12–7 and TCU beat Rice, 24–0
Illinois beat Army, 17–7 and Purdue beat Ole Miss 27–7
Pittsburgh beat Washington & Jefferson 21–0
Notre Dame defeated Drake University
Tulane beat Auburn, 52–0
USC beat visiting Nevada, 66–0 and California beat Montana 53–18

At Philadelphia, (5–1–0) Penn State defeated (5–1–0) Pennsylvania, 19–7

November 16

In Chicago, a record crowd of 123,000 turned out at Soldier Field to watch Notre Dame (6–0–0) and USC (6–1–0).  Knute Rockne, who had been hospitalized with an infected leg, guided his team from a cot set behind the Notre Dame bench.  In the third quarter, the Irish took a 13–6 lead, on—Savoldi's plunge and Frank Carideo's extra point.  On the ensuing kickoff, -- Saunders ran the ball back 95 yards for a touchdown, but the point after failed, and Notre Dame held on to win 13–12.

Nebraska and visiting Oklahoma played to a 13–13 draw; at (2–1–3), the Cornhuskers had tied more games than they had won or lost.  SMU beat Baylor, 25–6.  
TCU was (7–0–0) and had outscored its opposition 193–7; Texas (5–0–2) had an aggregate 120–0 lead on its opponents, though its last two games had been scoreless ties.  When they met at Austin, Texas scored first, but Cy Leland returned the kickoff 90 yards for a TCU score.  At halftime, TCU led 13–12 on the only extra point scored that day, and finished 15–12 
Illinois defeated Chicago 20–6 and Purdue beat Iowa 7–0
Pittsburgh beat Carnegie Tech, 34–13
Pennsylvania visited Columbia and won 20–0
California beat Washington 7–0

Tulane defeated Sewanee 18–0

November 23
Nebraska won at Kansas State, 10–6
SMU beat Rice, 34–0
TCU beat Baylor, 34–7
Illinois beat Ohio State, 27–0, and Purdue won at Indiana 32–0 to finish its season unbeaten.  Notre Dame won at Northwestern 26–6.
USC beat visiting Idaho, 72–0
Stanford (7–2–0) and California met in Palo Alto, with Stanford winning 21–6.

November 28, Thanksgiving Day; 
Pittsburgh beat Penn State 20–7
Pennsylvania beat Cornell 17–7
Nebraska closed its season with a 31–12 win over Iowa State, to finish at 4–1–3.

November 30
In a season-ending matchup of the Southwest Conference's two best teams at Fort Worth, 
Texas Christian (9–0–0) hosted Southern Methodist (6–0–3).  Although SMU took a 7–0 lead in the third quarter, and held the Frogs once at the goal line, TCU reached the one on its next possession, and scored on third down.  Hawks Green's kick staved off an upset, tied the Mustangs 7–7, and gave TCU the conference title.

Notre Dame (8–0–0) closed its season at Yankee Stadium in New York, where it faced Army (6–2–1).  The Fighting Irish won 7–0.
USC beat Washington State, 27–7
Tulane closed its season with a 21–0 win at LSU, to finish unbeaten at 9–0–0

On December 14, USC defeated Carnegie Tech, 45–13.

1930 Rose Bowl

USC had been beaten earlier in the year, at Chicago, by Notre Dame. The Trojans and the Fighting Irish were not able to agree on a rematch, and USC was given the right to invite another eastern powerhouse—the unbeaten (9–0–0) Pittsburgh Panthers. Pitt's bid for a claim to the national championship started on the first play of the game, as Toby Uansa ran 68 yards before being tackled at the 11, but the Panthers failed to reach the end zone. Six minutes into the game, Russ Saunders and --- Edelson connected on a 56-yard pass play for USC's first touchdown. By halftime, USC led 26–0. Pitt finally scored in the third quarter to trail 33–7. After seven USC touchdowns, the final score was USC 47, Pitt 14.

Conference standings

Major conference standings

Independents

Minor conferences

Minor conference standings

Dickinson System
The AP sportswriters' poll would not begin continuously until 1936. (although, the first time was a one instance publishing in 1934)  Frank G. Dickinson, an economics professor at the University of Illinois, had invented the Dickinson System to rank colleges based upon their records and the strength of their opposition.

The system was originally designed to rank teams in the Big Nine (later the Big Ten) conference.  Chicago clothing manufacturer Jack Rissman then persuaded Dickinson to rank the nation's teams under the system, and awarded the Rissman Trophy to the winning university.

The system awarded 30 points for a win over a "strong team", and 20 for a win over a "weak team".  Losses were awarded points (15 for loss to a strong team, 10 for loss to a weak team).  Ties were treated as half a win and half a loss (22.5 for a tie with a strong team, 15 for a tie with a weak team).  An average was then derived by dividing the points by games played.

Final Dickinson rankings

Notre Dame and Pittsburgh, both with nine wins and no losses or ties (9–0) were ranked first and second by Dickinson, with the Irish getting the higher rating based on their opposition. As Grantland Rice noted in his column, "There is no questioning the fact that among the unbeaten teams who were not even tied, Notre Dame fought its way through the hardest field. But when it comes to saying that Notre Dame could beat Pittsburgh or that Notre Dame could beat Purdue or that Pittsburgh could beat Purdue -- that is something else again,"

Awards and honors

All-Americans

The consensus All-America team included:

Statistical leaders
Player scoring most points: Gene McEver, Tennessee, 130
Receptions leader: Wear Schoonover, Arkansas, 33

References